Matthew Murray (1765–1826) was an English steam engine and machine tool manufacturer.

Matthew or Matt Murray may also refer to:

 Matthew Murray (minister) (1735–1791), Scottish minister and Fellow of the Royal Society of Edinburgh
 Matthew Murray (writer) (born 1976), American theater critic and technology writer
 Matthew J. Murray (1983–2007), American murderer
 Matt Murray (Scottish footballer) (1929–2016), Scottish footballer
 Matt Murray (baseball) (born 1970), American Major League Baseball pitcher
 Matt Murray (journalist) (born 1966), former editor of The Wall Street Journal
 Matt Murray (English footballer) (born 1981), English footballer
 Matt Murray (actor) (born 1989), American actor
 Matt Murray (ice hockey, born 1994), Canadian goaltender
 Matt Murray (ice hockey, born 1998), Canadian goaltender

See also
 Mathew Murray, known as M. H. Murray (born 1993), Canadian filmmaker